Kambing means "goat" in Malay, Filipino and Indonesian languages.

In cuisine, it may refer to:
 Sate kambing
 Sup Kambing

Geographically, it may refer to:
 Atauro Island or kambing island in East Timor.
 Kambing Island (East Java)
 Kambing Island (South Sulawesi)
 Kambing Island (Terengganu)